The Kelanitissa Power Station is a state-owned power station located on the south bank of the Kelani River in the northern part of the city of Colombo, Sri Lanka. Commissioned in 1964, it is the first thermal power station built in Sri Lanka, after the country gained independence. The facility is owned and operated by the Ceylon Electricity Board.

The power station has a total of 10 generation units: two  boiler steam units, six  gas turbines, one  gas turbine, and one  combined cycle unit. As of 2018, both  units and two  units were decommissioned after the commissioning of the combined cycle unit. The old units are now used as peak-load units. The  was sent to Italy for renovations in 2011.

The newest  naphtha-fuelled combined cycle unit was commissioned in August 2002. It consists of a  gas turbine and a  steam turbine, and one exhaust heat recovery boiler. The project was funded by the Overseas Economic Cooperation Fund of Japan.

Incidents 
 On 28 October 2008 at 23:30, the LTTE launched two bombs in an aerial attack on the power station, causing a fire and damaging the  government-owned Fiat unit. It took six months to restore the unit while one person was reported to have died, possibly due to shock. The attack was carried out using a Czech-built Zlín Z 42 single-engine trainer aircraft.
 On 21 April 2012 at about 03:00, a fire erupted at the power station complex, damaging the main switchboard for the plant's power generation machinery. Power generation was ceased, but did not trigger any blackouts due to alternative sources being available at the time. Six employees of the power station who inhaled noxious fumes as a result of the fire were hospitalized.
 On 3 February 2022 at about 20:00, the combined power station was shut down due to lack of fuel

See also 
 Sojitz Kelanitissa Power Station
 Electricity in Sri Lanka
 List of power stations in Sri Lanka

References 

Oil-fired power stations in Sri Lanka
Natural gas-fired power stations in Sri Lanka
Japan International Cooperation Agency
Buildings and structures in Colombo